Enrique Fuentes Quintana (1924 – 2007) was a Spanish economist, academic and politician, who served as deputy prime minister of Spain between 1977 and 1979 in the first cabinet after the Francoist State.

Early life and education
Quintana was born in Carrión de los Condes, Palencia, on 13 December 1924. His family were mostly jurists and farmers. He held a bachelor's degree in law (1948) and a PhD in political science and economics (1956), both of which he received from the University of Complutense in Madrid.

Career
Quintana taught economics at  different universities, namely the University of Valladolid (1956 – 1958), the University of Complutense in Madrid (1958 – 1978) and at the National University of Distance Education (UNED; 1978 – 1990). He was one of the economists credited with the success of Spanish economy in the 1960s. He served as the head of the research department at the ministry of finance. He was also the editor of a reformist monthly magazine, Información Comercial Española. In 1969, he became the director of the institute for fiscal studies. He served as the president of the Bank of Spain.

He was appointed deputy prime minister for economy to the cabinet led by Prime Minister Adolfo Suárez in 1977. Quintana developed a rationalization program in 1977 which constituted the basis for Spain to have an opportunity to be granted EEC membership. He was in office until 22 February 1978 when he resigned from office due to his marginalization in the cabinet. Quintana tried to follow the promises of the structural reforms in economy which were included in the Moncloa Pacts. These reforms required to reduce the production of steel and to nationalize the production of electricity among the others. However, Quintana's initiatives were not backed by conservatives supporting the cabinet, leading to his resignation. Fernando Abril Martorell succeeded him as deputy prime minister. Quintana's resignation was one of the reasons for the cabinet to adopt much more right-wing policies. After leaving office Quintana returned to teaching post and became emeritus professor at UNED.

In 1989 he was awarded the Asturias Award for social sciences.

Death
Quintana died of Alzheimer's disease at the age of 82 in Madrid on 6 June 2007.

References

External links

20th-century Spanish economists
1924 births
2007 deaths
Complutense University of Madrid alumni
Academic staff of the Complutense University of Madrid
Deaths from Alzheimer's disease
Deaths from dementia in Spain
Deputy Prime Ministers of Spain
Economy and finance ministers of Spain
Academic staff of the National University of Distance Education
People from Carrión de los Condes
Academic staff of the University of Valladolid
Independent politicians in Spain